On 4 June 2017, United States Army Special Forces Staff Sergeant Logan Melgar was found dead as a result of asphyxiation, in the American embassy's housing in Mali that he shared with other members of U.S. Special Operations. The incident has been described as either result of a "hazing" or to cover up other crimes committed by the perpetrators.

Shortly after Melgar's death, two unnamed members of the US Navy's SEAL Team Six were flown out of Mali and placed on administrative leave as persons of interest to the Naval Criminal Investigative Service. By February 2018, the strangulation had prompted a broad internal military audit and investigation of SEAL Team Six, which named the two members who were persons of interest in the homicide and initially focused on analyzing their conflicting statements regarding Melgar's death. While they had stated that Melgar had been intoxicated on the evening of his death, he was determined to have no drugs or alcohol in his system when he died. Melgar was further determined to have had his throat and upper body mutilated in an apparent attempt at a tracheotomy. The two Navy SEALs stated that they found Melgar unconscious and not breathing and that they tried to perform an emergency tracheotomy on him. One of the SEALs subsequently stated that he accidentally choked Melgar during a practice match. A continued focus of the investigation was allegations that Melgar had discovered that the two SEALs had stolen cash earmarked for paying local informants and that he had told the two that he would report that. The two SEALs denied this allegation.

In November 2018, two SEALs, Petty Officer Anthony E. DeDolph and Chief Petty Officer Adam C. Matthews, along with two US Marine Corps Raiders, Gunnery Sgt. Mario Madera-Rodriguez and Staff Sgt. Kevin Maxwell Jr., were charged with the felony murder of Logan Melgar, along with other crimes. On 17 May 2019 Chief Petty Officer Matthews was sentenced to one year's detention in a military prison after having pleaded guilty and agreeing to testify in the cases against the other defendants. On 7 June 2019 Staff Sgt. Kevin Maxwell Jr. was sentenced to four years' detention after having pleaded guilty. On 23 January 2021, Petty Officer Anthony E. DeDolph was sentenced to ten years detention after pleading guilty. On 1 July 2021, Madera-Rodriguez was convicted of involuntary manslaughter as well as conspiracy to commit assault and battery, conspiracy to obstruct justice, hazing and making false official statements.

See also
Bullying in the military
Military abuse

References

2017 deaths
Deaths from asphyxiation
Deaths in Mali
Hazing
SEAL Team Six
United States Army Special Operations Command
1983 births